The Bolivar Commercial was a newspaper in Cleveland, Mississippi from 1916 to 2020. It was owned by Walls Newspapers.

Amid large revenue losses associated with the COVID-19 pandemic, Commercial owner Lee Walls in April 2020 announced that the newspaper would cease publication at the end of the month. In his statement detailing the reasons for the newspaper's closure, Walls cited the rise of Facebook and other social media, as well as the demise of a local car dealership that had been one of the Commercial's primary advertisers. At the time of its close, the paper published a print edition just two days a week and employed a staff of nine full-time employees and one part-time.

The newspaper did not publish during on Christmas Day, New Year's Day, Thanksgiving Day, Independence Day, and Labor Day. It was the only printed newspaper in Bolivar County and had been in circulation for 104 years when its closure was announced.

References

External links

The Bolivar Commercial

Newspapers published in Mississippi
Cleveland, Mississippi